Heather Watson was the defending champion, but lost to Polona Hercog in the first round.

Karolína Plíšková won the title, defeating Lucie Hradecká in the final, 4–6, 7–5, 6–3.

Seeds

Draw

Finals

Top half

Bottom half

Qualifying

Seeds

Qualifiers

Draw

First qualifier

Second qualifier

Third qualifier

Fourth qualifier

External links 
 Main draw
 Qualifying draw

Prague Open - Singles
WTA Prague Open